Just Missed the Train is a Danielle Brisebois compilation album released on September 26, 2006. It contains numerous tracks from her 1994 debut Arrive All Over You and the rare B-sides "Sinking Slow", "Pretty Baby", and an acoustic version of "Just Missed the Train".

Track listing

External links
Amazon listing
NewRadicals.us thread w/info
Danielle Brisebois albums
2006 compilation albums